The Devil Rides Out, known as The Devil's Bride in the United States, is a 1968 British horror film, based on the 1934 novel of the same name by Dennis Wheatley. It was written by Richard Matheson and directed by Terence Fisher. The film stars Christopher Lee, Charles Gray, Niké Arrighi and Leon Greene.

It is considered one of Terence Fisher's best films. It is the final film to be produced by Seven Arts Productions after the company was merged with Warner Bros. to become Warner Bros.-Seven Arts on July 15, 1967.

Plot 
Set in London and the south of England in 1929, the story finds erudite Nicholas, Duc de Richleau (Christopher Lee), investigating the strange actions of his protegé, the son of a late friend, Simon Aron (Patrick Mower), who has a house replete with strange markings and a pentagram. He quickly deduces that Simon is involved with the occult. De Richleau and his friend Rex Van Ryn (Leon Greene) manage to rescue Simon and another young initiate, Tanith (Niké Arrighi), from a devil-worshipping cult. During the rescue, they disrupt a May Day ceremony on Salisbury Plain, in which the Devil appears under the guise of the "Goat of Mendes".

They escape to the country home of de Richleau's niece Marie (Sarah Lawson) and her husband Richard Eaton (Paul Eddington). They are followed by the group's leader, Mocata (Charles Gray), who has a psychic connection to the two initiates. After visiting the house while de Richleau is absent to discuss the matter and an unsuccessful attempt to influence the initiates to return, Mocata forces de Richleau and the other occupants to defend themselves through a night of black magic attacks, ending with the conjuring of the Angel of Death. De Richleau repels the angel, but it kills Tanith instead (as, once summoned, it must take a life).

His attacks defeated, Mocata kidnaps the Eatons' young daughter Peggy (Rosalyn Landor). The Duc has Tanith's spirit possess Marie in order to find Mocata, but they only are able to get a single clue, and Rex realizes that the cultists are at a house he visited earlier. Simon tries to rescue Peggy on his own, but he is recaptured by the cult. De Richleau, Richard, and Rex also try to rescue her, but they are defeated by Mocata. Suddenly, a powerful force (or Tanith herself) controls Marie and ends Peggy's trance. She then leads Peggy in the recitation of a spell which visits divine retribution upon the cultists and transforms their coven room into a church.

When the Duc and his companions awaken, they discover that the spell has reversed time and changed the future in their favour. Simon and Tanith have survived, and Mocata's spell to conjure the Angel of Death has been reflected back on him. Divine judgement ends his life, and he is subject to eternal damnation for his unholy summoning of the Angel of Death. De Richleau comments that it is God to whom they must be thankful.

Cast 
 Christopher Lee – Nicholas, Duc de Richleau
 Charles Gray – Mocata
 Niké Arrighi – Tanith Carlisle
 Leon Greene – Rex Van Ryn (dubbed by Patrick Allen)
 Patrick Mower – Simon Aron
 Gwen Ffrangcon-Davies – Countess d'Urfe
 Sarah Lawson – Marie Eaton
 Paul Eddington – Richard Eaton
 Rosalyn Landor – Peggy Eaton
 Russell Waters – Malin
 Eddie Powell – The Goat of Mendes (uncredited)
 Yemi Ajibade - The African (uncredited)

Production 

First proposed in 1963, the film eventually went ahead four years later once censorship worries over Satanism had eased. Production began on 7 August 1967, and the film starred Christopher Lee (in a rare heroic role), Charles Gray, Niké Arrighi and Leon Greene. The screenplay was adapted by Richard Matheson from Wheatley's novel. Christopher Lee had often stated that of all his vast back catalogue of films, this was his favourite and the one he would have liked to have seen remade with modern special effects and with his playing a mature Duke de Richleau.  In a later interview, Lee also stated that Wheatley was so pleased with the adaptation of his book that he gave the actor a first edition of the novel.

The A-side of British rock band Icarus's debut single "The Devil Rides Out" was inspired by the advance publicity for the film of the same name. Though the song does not appear in the film, the single's release was timed to coincide with the film's premiere and the band was invited to the premiere.

Themes 
Unlike other Hammer films, The Devil Rides Out has little sexual or violent content. The film's tone is more serious than many other Hammer titles.

Paul Leggett, in his study of Terence Fisher's films, describes The Devil Rides Out, despite its occult themes, as a "total conquest of Christianity over the forces of evil". Leggett sees the film's script drawing inspiration from the works of Charles Williams and C.S. Lewis in addition to Wheatley's novel. The film portrays in a serious manner a spiritual reality underlying the physical universe, and the sceptics of the supernatural becoming unwitting allies of evil.

Professor Peter Hutchings stated that the film has noticeable paternalistic themes: the struggle between good and evil is set up with the older male "savant" authority figures (Duke de Richleau and Mocata), while the younger characters are incapable of defending themselves without subjecting to their authorities.

Reception 

Reviews of the film have been widely favourable. It currently has a 93% "Fresh" rating on Rotten Tomatoes.

Box office 
According to Fox records the film required $1,150,000 in rentals to break even, but by 11 December 1970 it had only made $575,000, making it a loss to the studio.

References

Bibliography

External links 
 
 
 
 
 

1968 films
1968 horror films
1960s fantasy films
Films shot at Associated British Studios
Hammer Film Productions horror films
Films based on horror novels
Films based on works by Dennis Wheatley
Films directed by Terence Fisher
Films scored by James Bernard
Films set in 1929
Films about Satanism
Dark fantasy films
Folk horror films
Films with screenplays by Richard Matheson
British supernatural horror films
Films based on British novels
The Devil in film
Gothic horror films
1960s English-language films
1960s British films